Elections in the Republic of India in 2000 included elections to four state legislative assemblies.

Legislative Assembly elections

Bihar

The Bihar legislative assembly election, 2000 was held on year 2000 for Bihar Legislative Assembly. Rashtriya Janata Dal won 103 seats in election and form the government.

Haryana

The Haryana legislative assembly election, 2000 was held on 22 February 2000, to select the 90 members of the Haryana Legislative Assembly.

Manipur

Odisha

References

2000 elections in India
India
2000 in India
Elections in India by year